The men's heptathlon at the 2010 IAAF World Indoor Championships was held at the ASPIRE Dome on 12 and 13 March.

Medalists

Records

Qualification standards
 the three best athletes from the 2009 Outdoor Lists (as at 31 December 2009) limited to a maximum of one per country and
 the three best athletes form the 2010 Indoor Lists during (as at 22 February 2010)
 two athletes which may be invited at the discretion of the IAAF
In total no more than two male and two female athletes from any one Member will be invited.
Upon refusals or cancellations, the invitations shall be extended to the next ranked athletes in the same lists respecting the above conditions.
Members whose athletes are invited as above will receive additional quota places accordingly

Schedule

Results

60 metres

Long jump

Shot put

High jump

60 metres hurdles

Pole vault

1000 metres

Final standings

References
60 metres Results
Long jump Results
Shot put Results
High jump Results
60 metres hurdles Results
Pole vault Results
1000 metres Results
Summary Results

Heptathlon
Combined events at the World Athletics Indoor Championships